Squiddly Diddly is an anthropomorphic animated octopus created by Hanna-Barbera, who was featured in his own cartoon segment on The Atom Ant/Secret Squirrel Show beginning in 1965.

Fictional character biography
The round-headed, sailor-hatted Squiddly (who resembles an octopus—albeit with only six tentacles—rather than a squid) is kept captive in an aquatic park known as Bubbleland and resides in a pool with his name on it. Squiddly Diddly is an aspiring musician who makes many attempts to escape and attain musical stardom, but he is constantly foiled by Bubbleland's administrator Chief Winchley. In some episodes, Squiddly Diddly manages to escape, but chooses to return to Bubbleland after finding the outside world to be too harsh. Other times Squiddly and Chief Winchley would have to work together to solve problems in Bubbleland. The cartoons show people applauding Squiddly Diddly's musical talents, but often depict terrified people who mistakenly believed that octopuses are hostile.

List of episodes

Season 1 (1965–66)

Season 2 (1966-67)

Voice cast
 Paul Frees - Squiddly Diddly
 John Stephenson - Chief Winchley

Home video
On November 3, 2015, Warner Archive released The Secret Squirrel Show: The Complete Series on DVD in region 1 as part of their Hanna–Barbera Classics Collection. This release contains all the Squiddly Diddly shorts.

The episode "Way Out Squiddly" is also available on the DVD Saturday Morning Cartoons Vol. 1.

Squiddly Diddly in other languages
 Brazilian Portuguese: Lula Lelé
 Spanish: El pulpo Manotas
 French: Squiddly la pieuvre
 Dutch: Inky de inktvis
 Italian: Squiddly Diddly
 German: Squiddly Diddly
 Japanese: Tako no Roku chan
 Tunisian Arabic: قرينط الشلواش (Qrīnaṭ il-šalwāš)
 Serbian: Сима Сипа (Sima Sipa)

In other media

 In 1966, Hanna-Barbera Records released Squiddly Diddly's Surfin' Surfari on LP.
 Squiddly Diddly was featured in Yogi's Gang (1973) voiced by Don Messick.
 Squiddly Diddly made a lone comic book appearance in 1966, as a back-up feature in the only issue of Secret Squirrel, published by Gold Key Comics, and again in 1996, courtesy of Hanna-Barbera Presents #6, published by Archie Comics.
 Squiddly and Chief Winchley appeared in Yogi's Treasure Hunt.
 Squiddly Diddly made two appearances on Yo Yogi!. First, he appered in the episode "Mall or Nothing" where he's juggling for the Mall-a-thon. Then, he made a cameo in the episode "The Big Snoop" where he is amongst those looking for Super Snooper when he ends up kidnapped. In the former episode, he was voiced by Don Messick.
 In the British comedy Only Fools and Horses Christmas Special 1989 "The Jolly Boys' Outing", Squiddly Diddly was cited by Del Boy as the reason for the failure of his seafood stall, since people were unwilling to consume creatures they had become fond of.
 Squiddly Diddly has been seen on HBO's The Ricky Gervais Show, where the character is involved in a few scripts, including being side by side with a killer octopus and giving Karl Pilkington a rectal examination.
 Squiddly Diddly appears in the Harvey Birdman, Attorney at Law episodes "SPF", "Gone Efficien...t" and "The Death of Harvey". Chief Winchley makes a cameo in "Juror in Court".
 Squiddly Diddly made a cameo in a 2012 MetLife commercial entitled "Everyone".
 Squiddly Diddly's body is shown in Janni Nemo's office in the 2015 graphic novel Nemo: River of Ghosts, written by Alan Moore and illustrated by Kevin O'Neill.
 Squiddly Diddly made a cameo as an animatronic in the Dexter's Laboratory episode "Chubby Cheese".
 Simon Cowell has two dogs named Squiddly and Diddly, a catchphrase he has often used on reality TV shows over the years.
 Squiddly Diddly appears several times in Mark Russell's 2018 comic book Exit, Stage Left!: The Snagglepuss Chronicles.
 Squiddly Diddly makes a cameo in the Wacky Races episode "Wacklantis" as various sea life are summoned by the king of Atlantis.
 Squiddly Diddly makes two cameo appearances in Scoob!, as part of a mural on the side of the building and on a billboard for Bubbleland.
 Squiddly Diddly makes an appearance as a silhouette in the 2020 Animaniacs revival segment "Suffragette City".
 Squiddly Diddly appears in Jellystone!, voiced by Niccole Thurman. While the original promo image presented Squiddly as a male, the character is female in the actual series. She works at a music store. Bubbleland and Chief Winchley have yet to appear.
 Squiddly Diddly is the star of his own poem, "The Story of Squiddly Diddly", which was written by Theodora Shilliton and won at 2021's National Poetry Day. The poem involves the titular squid as he tries to stop people from polluting the ocean while befriending a tuna, a sea turtle, and a sea cow along the way.

References

External links

 Squiddly Diddly at the Big Cartoon DataBase
 Squiddly Diddly - Cartoon Network Department of Cartoons (Archive)

Animated television series about animals
Fictional squid
Hanna-Barbera characters
Television series by Hanna-Barbera
Television characters introduced in 1965
American children's animated comedy television series